Rudakov is a Russian masculine surname, its feminine counterpart is Rudakova. Notable people with the surname include:

Aleksandr Rudakov (1817–1875), Russian naval officer 
Andrei Rudakov (born 1961), Russian football player
Anton Rudakov (born 1989), Russian football defender
Ekaterina Rudakova (born 1984), Belarusian cross-country skier 
Fedor Rudakov (born 1994), Russian Paralympic athlete
Igor Rudakov (born 1934), Russian rower
Larisa Rudakova (born 1963), Russian soprano singer
Mikhail Rudakov (1905–1979), Soviet military leader
Paul Roudakoff (1907–1993), American military officer
Valeriy Rudakov (born 1955), Ukrainian football player and coach 
Vera Rudakova (born 1992), Russian hurdler 
Yevhen Rudakov (1942–2011), Ukrainian football goalkeeper
Yevhen Rudakov club, an unofficial list of Soviet football goalkeepers that have achieved 100 or more clean sheets

Russian-language surnames